Jy Bond (born 22 April 1979) is a former American football punter. He was signed by the Miami Dolphins as a street free agent in 2009.

Bond has also been a member of the New York Giants and Hartford Colonials.

Australian football career
The son of former Australian rules football player Graeme Bond, Jy Bond followed his father to  under the father/son rule but did not play senior football with the team.

American football career
Bond began training to be a punter in the NFL after a holiday in the USA in 2005. Jy worked with Sav Rocca (another ex AFL player with the Philadelphia Eagles) and his agent to move into the NFL. He signed with the Miami Dolphins of the NFL in March 2009. Jy was offered a college scholarship a number of years previous while visiting his brother who was on a baseball scholarship in the USA. For personal reasons he was unable to accept the offer.

Since 2009, Jy has been coached and mentored by Darren Bennett. Bond also worked with fellow Aussie NFL player Sav Rocca.

Jy also played for the Western Crusaders, an American Football team located in Melbourne, Australia. He is a member of their team of the century.

Miami Dolphins
Bond signed a two-year contract with the Miami Dolphins on 3 March 2009. He competed with incumbent Brandon Fields for the Dolphins' punting job in training camp, but was released.

New York Giants
Bond signed with the New York Giants on 18 March 2010.

Bond returned to the New York Giants for their mini camp in May 2012. In 2012, NFL teams–New York Jets, Carolina Panthers and Chicago Bears expressed interest in Bond as a Punter. In 2013 Bond worked out with the Jets and also Tampa Bay before returning to NY Giants.

Jy is now involved in the media and also runs a feeder program to the NCAA and NFL with former NFL player Ben Graham and Darren Bennett. They are currently working with ex-Carlton player, Brendan Fevola. 

Bond now works in Talent Management for his native Australian rules football.

References

5  All eyes on our Ben Graham in the Super Bowl  http://www.heraldsun.com.au/sport/more-sport/all-eyes-on-our-ben-in-super-bowl/story-e6frfglf-1111118727123

External links
Official website
Western Crusaders

1979 births
Living people
Sportspeople from Melbourne
Australian expatriate sportspeople in the United States
Footballers who switched code
Australian players of American football
American football punters
Miami Dolphins players
New York Giants players
Hartford Colonials players